Bassey Asuquo was a Nigerian soldier who served as Military Administrator of Delta State between December 1993 and September 1994, and then Edo State from September 1994 to December 1996, during the military regime of General Sani Abacha.
He retired as a brigadier general.

In 2008, he was Clan Head of Anim Ankiong Clan Council of Odukpani Local Government area in Cross River State. He testified before  the House Committee on Power and Steel investigating funds paid for the Calabar 561MW GT power station, saying that the project  delays were caused by the contractors and were not due to resistance from the community.
In September 2009 he was appointed chairman of the board of the Federal Psychiatric Hospital, Calabar.

Education
He attended Hussey College Warri.

References

Nigerian generals
Living people
Governors of Edo State
Nigerian military governors of Delta State
Delta State politicians
Hussey College Warri alumni
Year of birth missing (living people)